Allum is an English surname.  Notable people with this name include:

 Bert Allum (1930–2018), English footballer
 Bill Allum (1916–1992), Canadian ice hockey player and coach
 Don Allum (1937–1992), English oarsman, the first person to row across the Atlantic Ocean in both directions
 James Allum, Canadian politician
 John Allum (1889–1972), New Zealand businessman and engineer, Mayor of Auckland City from 1941 to 1953
 Ron Allum (b. 1949), Australian submarine designer

See also 
 Allums

References 

English-language surnames